Rebecca Sowden (born 14 September 1981) is an association football player who represented New Zealand at international level.

Sowden made her Football Ferns début in a 0–2 loss to China on 22 February 2004, and finished her international career with 10 caps to her credit.

References

1981 births
Living people
New Zealand women's association footballers
New Zealand women's international footballers
Women's association footballers not categorized by position
People educated at Westlake Girls High School